John Thomas Financial was a privately held financial services firm located in the Financial District of New York City. It closed in July 2013 after its founder, Anastasios "Thomas" Belesis was sued by the Securities and Exchange Commission for deceiving investors.

In 2009, John Thomas Financial moved its offices into 14 Wall Street, where it occupied the entire 23rd floor. The firm was founded in 2007 by Thomas Belesis, who served as CEO. Initially a three-person brokerage, it grew to 200 representatives and staff providing retail brokerage, investment banking and corporate advisory services. It also added a private wealth management affiliate.

In addition to its retail brokerage services, the firm raised convertible debt for startups and new companies.

Leadership

The company President and CEO was Thomas Belesis, a frequent contributor to financial news shows. He played a role in the movie Wall Street: Money Never Sleeps which was partly filmed at John Thomas Financial. Belesis used his media exposure to support the image of Wall Street, launching rallies and a website, to improve the image of stock traders.

Controversy

The New York Post looked into the "shady" past of Thomas Belesis in an April 2012 article. In early 2013, another series of New York Post articles covered an investigation by the Financial Industry Regulatory Authority (FINRA) into the dealings of John Thomas Financial. The articles reported on Belesis being served with a Wells notice, and the potential for the investigation to result in prosecution. Bloomberg L.P. interviewed former employees and questioned whether the business practices and sales tactics of John Thomas Financial constituted those of a boiler room.

References

Former investment banks of the United States
American companies established in 2007
Financial services companies established in 2007
Banks established in 2007
Financial services companies disestablished in 2013
Banks disestablished in 2013
Financial services companies based in New York (state)